Myth of a Man is the fourth studio album by American band Night Beats. It was released on January 18, 2019 through Heavenly Recordings.

Track listing

References

2019 albums
Heavenly Recordings albums